This is a list of awards and nominations of Puerto Rican singer Kany García. Here are the awards she has won during her musical career.

ASCAP Awards
These awards are given to songwriters and producers.

||
|-
|rowspan="1"| 2014 ||Kany García||Pop Song of the Year for Cuando Se Va El Amor ||  ||

Latin Grammys Awards
The Latin Grammy Awards are awarded annually by the National Academy of Recording Arts and Sciences of the United States.
|| 
|-
|rowspan="4"| 2008 || Cualquier Día || Best Female Pop Vocal Album|| 
|-
|Kany García || Best New Artist || 
|-
|"Hoy Ya Me Voy" || Song of the Year || 
|-
|"Cualquier Día" || Album of the Year || 
|-
|rowspan="1"| 2010 || Boleto De Entrada || Best Female Pop Vocal Album|| 
|-
|rowspan="1"| 2012 || Que Te Vaya Mal || Record of the Year|| 
|-
|rowspan="2"| 2013 || Kany Garcia || Best Singer-Songwriter Album|| 
|-
|Kany Garcia || Best Engineered Album || 
|-
|rowspan="4" scope="row"| 2018
|rowspan="2"| Para Siempre
|scope="row"| Record of the Year
| 
|-
|scope="row"| Song of the Year
| 
|-
|rowspan="2"| Soy Yo
|scope="row"| Album of the Year
| 
|-
|scope="row"| Best Singer-Songwriter Album
| 
|-
|rowspan="3" scope="row"| 2019
|rowspan="1"|"Banana Papaya"
|scope="row"|Best Short Form Music Video
| 
|-
|rowspan="1"| "Contra el Viento"
|scope="row"| Best Singer-Songwriter Album
| 
|-
|rowspan="1"| "Quédate" featuring Tommy Torres
|scope="row"| Record of the Year
| 
|-
|rowspan="1" scope="row"| 2022
|rowspan="1"|Herself
|scope="row"|Leading Ladies of Entertainment
| 
|-

Grammy Awards
The Grammy Awards are awarded annually by the National Academy of Recording Arts and Sciences of the United States.

{| class="wikitable"
!Awards ceremony
!Award
!Nominated work
!Result
|-
|2011 Grammy Awards 
|Best Latin Pop Album
|Boleto de Entrada
|
|-
|2013 Grammy Awards 
|Best Latin Pop Album
|Kany Garcia
|
|-
|2021 Grammy Awards 
|Best Latin Pop or Urban Album
|Mesa Para Dos
|
|-

GLAAD Media Awards
||
|-
|rowspan="1"| 2016 ||Kany García||Outstanding Music Artist (Spanish)|| 
|-

Billboard Latin Music Awards 
The Billboard Latin Music Awards are awarded each year by Billboard Magazine based on radio airplay, digital downloads and album sales.
||
|-
|rowspan="4"| 2008 || Cualquier Día || Latin Pop Album of the Year, New Artist|| 
|-
|"Hoy Ya Me Voy" || Latin Pop Airplay Song of the Year, New Artist|| 
|-
|"Hoy Ya Me Voy" || Latin Pop Airplay Song of the Year, Female || 
|-
|"¿Qué Nos Pasó?" || Latin Pop Airplay Song of the Year, New Artist||

Orgullosamente Latino
The Orgullosamente Latino are awarded each year by fans all around the world. The awards are taken place in Puerto Rico.
||
|-
|rowspan="1"| 2010 ||Kany García||Female Soloist of the Year|| 
|-

Premios Oye
The Premios Oye are awards each year by the Mexican Recording Industry.

|-
|rowspan="2"| 2008|| Kany García || Revelación del Año || 
|-
| Kany García || Pop Español Solista Femenino ||

Premio Lo Nuestro 
The Premio Lo Nuestro are awards given by the fans and music producers. They are given each year.

|-
| 2009 || Kany García || Artista Femenina Pop Del Año|| 
|-
| 2011 || Kany García || Artista Femenina Pop Del Año||

Premio Juventud 
The Premio Juventud are awards given and voted by the young fans. They are given each year.

|-
| 2010 || Somos El Mundo || La Combinacion Perfecta (The Perfect Combination)||

Premios Paoli
The Premios Paoli are awards voted by the fans and awards given in Puerto Rico.

|-
| 2010 || Kany García || Cantante Femenina Del Año||

Premios People en Español
These awards are voted by fans on peopleenespanol.com

|-
| 2012 || Kany García || Cantante Femenina Del Año||

Premios TV y Novela
The Premios TV y Novela are awards given for performances in soap operas (novelas).
 
|-
| 2011 || Para Volver Amar || Mejor Tema Musical de TeleNovela (Best Song from Soap Opera)||

Soberano awards
 
|-
| 2019 || Kany García || Soberano Internacional ||

Other achievements
 Kany became Billboard Magazine 2007 Latin Breakthrough New Artist of the Year
García was included on iTunes Latino Best of 2008, on where she was named one of the Best New Artist.
The album "Boleto De Entrada" was included on iTunes Latino "Albums of the Year: Pop Latino 2009".
"The album "Kany Garcia" was included on "iTunes" Latino "Best of 2012: Pop & Urban".

References

García, Kany